Atkinson is a community in the Canadian province of Nova Scotia, located in Cumberland County.

References

Atkinson - Geographical Names Board of Canada

Communities in Cumberland County, Nova Scotia